is a junction passenger railway station located in Kanagawa-ku, Yokohama, Japan, operated by East Japan Railway Company (JR East).

Lines
Higashi-Kanagawa Station is served by the Keihin-Tōhoku Line and Yokohama Line.

Station layout
The station has two ground-level island platforms serving four tracks, connected to the station building by a footbridge. Although the Tōkaidō Main Line and Yokosuka Line tracks run parallel to the station, neither line stops at Higashi-Kanagawa. The station has a Midori no Madoguchi staffed ticket office.

Platforms

From 15 September 2013, new LED lighting was installed on the platforms. This lighting switches between light blue and light green to indicate whether individual departing trains are Keihin-Tohoku Line or Yokohama Line services.

History
Higashi-Kanagawa Station opened on 23 September 1908, as a joint use station on the Japanese Government Railways (JGR) Tōkaidō Main Line (the predecessor to JNR) and the privately owned Yokohama Railway Line (which connected Yokohama Station with Hachiōji Station. A spur line for freight operations to Umikanagawa Station (closed in 1959) was established on December 10, 1911. The Keihin Electric Train (the forerunner to the Keihin-Tōhoku Line) began operations from Higashi-Kanagawa from December 20, 1914. The Yokohama Railway Line was nationalized on 1 October 1917. With the privatization of JNR on 1 April 1987, the station came under the operational control of JR East. 

Station numbering was introduced on 20 August 2016 with Higashi-Kanagawa being assigned station number JK13 for the Keihin-Tohoku Line and JH13 for the Yokohoma Line.

Passenger statistics
In fiscal 2019, the station was used by an average of 37,577 passengers daily (boarding passengers only). 

The daily average passenger figures (boarding passengers only) for previous years are as shown below.

Surrounding area
 Keikyū Higashi-kanagawa Station (connected by a pedestrian deck)
 Kanagawa Ward Office

See also
 List of railway stations in Japan

References

External links

 Higashi-Kanagawa Station (JR East Station Information) 

 

Railway stations in Kanagawa Prefecture
Railway stations in Japan opened in 1908
Keihin-Tōhoku Line
Yokohama Line
Tōkaidō Main Line
Stations of East Japan Railway Company
Buildings and structures in Japan destroyed during World War II
Railway stations in Yokohama